Steins may refer to:

People 
 Kārlis Šteins, Latvian astronomer
 Walter Steins, Dutch Jesuit priest

Astronomy 
 2867 Šteins, a small main-belt asteroid

Video games 
 Steins;???

See also 
 Stein (disambiguation)
 Trevor Stines, American actor
 Steins, New Mexico, Ghost town